"Texarkana Baby" is a song written by Fred Rose and Cottonseed Clark.

Background
The song was first made popular by Eddy Arnold in 1948. Eddy Arnold and his Tennessee Plow Boys and his Guitar recorded it in New York City on January 6, 1947. It was released by RCA Victor Records as catalog number 20-2806 in the United States and by EMI on the His Master's Voice (HMV) label as catalog numbers BD 1234 and IM 1399. "Texarkana Baby" was the B-side of Arnold's version of "Bouquet of Roses" and made it to number one on the Best Selling Retail Folk Records chart for one week  in between the nineteen weeks "Bouquet of Roses" stayed at number one.

On March 31, 1949, "Texarkana Baby" was among the first seven-inch 45 rpm records issued by RCA in the United States. Often given credit as the very first release, or the first-ever Country record to be released in this format, it was just one of many 45s released on that first day. Texarkana/Bouquet appears in green vinyl as 48-0001, an odd choice since RCA generally started a series with 0000 (Crudup 50-0000, Meisels 51-0000, Goodman 52-0000). Likely, 48-0000 was assigned then later withdrawn due to contract or copyright problems. Still Mr. Arnold gets credit for the first country 45.
The first production 45 rpm record pressed was "PeeWee the Piccolo" RCA 47-0146 pressed Dec. 7, 1948, at RCA's Sherman Avenue plant in Indianapolis, Indiana.

Cover versions
Bob Wills and His Texas Playboys recorded their version of "Texarkana Baby" on December 30, 1947, during the so-called "Tiffany Transcriptions" sessions in California; this version peaked at number fifteen on the Billboard chart on July 24, 1948.
A cover of this song by Duke Special is included as a bonus track on the Deluxe Edition of their album I Never Thought This Day Would Come.

References

1948 songs 
Eddy Arnold songs
Songs written by Fred Rose (songwriter)